Let Chaos Prevail is a 2007 album by Demigod, released on Xtreem Music.

Track listing
 "Not Dead Enough" - 3:55
 "Let Chaos Prevail" - 3:46
 "Dark Turns Black" - 5:17
 "Cult Of Sickness" - 3:59
 "God Said Suffer" - 4:22
 "To See The Last One Die" - 3:39
 "Self-caged" - 3:16
 "End Of Evolution" - 4:37
 "The Uncrowned" - 3:39
 "Baptized In Enmity" - 4:03

Personnel
 Jussi Kiiski - guitars
 Tero Laitinen - guitars
 Tuomas Ala-Nissilä - vocals
 Tuomo Latvala - drums
 Sami Vesanto - bass
 Produced by Henri Virsell and Demigod
 Engineered and Mixed at Fantom Studio by Henri Virsell
 Assistant Engineer Timo Haakana
 Drums recorded at PopStudio by Mika Haapasalo
 Mastered at Finnvox Studios by Mika Jussila
 Cover design and layout by Jani Rämö
 Cover art by Russa Lynn Waldren

2007 albums
Demigod (band) albums